Jean Mendy may refer to:
 Jean Alassane Mendy, Senegalese footballer. 
 Jean Baptiste Mendy, Senegal-born French boxer